On the Run is a 1958 British drama film directed by Ernest Morris and starring Neil McCallum, Susan Beaumont and William Hartnell. The screenplay concerns a boxer who becomes romantically involved with a woman.

Cast
 Neil McCallum ...  Wesley
 Susan Beaumont ...  Kitty Casey
 William Hartnell ...  Tom Casey
 Gordon Tanner ...  Bart Taylor
 Philip Saville ...  Driscoll
 Gil Winfield ...  Joe
 Hal Osmond ...  Sam Bassett

References

External links

1958 films
1958 drama films
Films directed by Ernest Morris
British drama films
1950s English-language films
1950s British films